Delta Cafés is a Portuguese coffee roasting and coffee packaging company headquartered in Campo Maior, Alentejo. The company was founded in 1961 and is among the top market leaders in the Iberian Peninsula. The company belongs to Rui Nabeiro, the personal conglomerate of its founder Rui Nabeiro, which include interests in agribusiness, agriculture, real estate, hotels, and other services.

History
Delta Cafés was founded by Rui Nabeiro in 1961 in the town of Campo Maior, Alentejo, in a small  warehouse, which could only handle two  roasters and with the participation of only three workers. In 1994, the company became Portugal's market leader with  a share of 42%. In 1998, the Nabeiro/Delta Cafés Group was restructured and gave rise to 22 companies organized into strategic areas, with turnover of approximately €160 million. In the 2000s, it became the market leader for coffee in Portugal, with a market share of 38%. It has 47,000 direct retail clients (among the largest of which is Sonae, a leading Portuguese retailer) and 3,000 employees. Also in the 2007, Delta Cafés launched its own espresso products, Delta Q, based on a proprietary system of single-serving "capsules" containing ground coffee and rooibos, and specialized machines to brew espresso from the contents of the capsules in a similar way to that of Nestlé's Nespresso brand portfolio. In October 2017, Delta Cafes partnered with the 'e-commerce' platform Alibaba. In July 2018, Delta joined the international coffee association International Coffee Partners (ICP).

References

External links

Coffee brands
Portuguese brands
Drink companies of Portugal
Food and drink companies established in 1961
Portuguese companies established in 1961
Coffee in Europe
Agriculture companies of Portugal